John Mock is an American multi-instrumentalist, composer, arranger, producer, and photographer with a particular interest in the topic of maritime history and culture.

Biography

Early years
Mock is a native of Connecticut’s eastern shore. His father was in the Coast Guard in New London, Connecticut, and Mock grew to love the ocean and shoreline. Mock began playing guitar at age 15. When he visited Ireland at age 28, he started playing the tin whistle, and he took up the concertina in his 30s.

Studio work, composing, and arranging 
Eventually, Mock left the Atlantic coast for Nashville, where he works as a composer, producer, arranger and instrumentalist. Studio and live credits include James Taylor, the Dixie Chicks, Rodney Crowell, Ricky Skaggs and Kentucky Thunder, Dolly Parton, Randy Travis, Sylvia, Kathy Mattea, Nanci Griffith, Tim O'Brien, Mark O'Connor, Gretchen Peters, Maura O'Connell, Lady Antebellum, Martina McBride, Sara Evans, and many others.

His orchestral arrangements have been performed by the London Symphony Orchestra and the National Symphony Orchestra, as well as the symphonies of Atlanta and Nashville. His work "The Stone" was included on the Nashville Chamber Orchestra's 1997 Warner Bros, Debut.

Mock’s film scoring credits include the 2017 SONY/Affirm film “All Saints” (written with Conni Ellisor) starring John Corbett, Barry Corbin, and Cara Buono. John's music can also be heard in the independent film “The Otherworld”.

The Dixie Chicks performed Mock's arrangement of "The Star-Spangled Banner" at Super Bowl XXXVII.

From The Shoreline
Mock has toured extensively to stage his concert presentation From the Shoreline, which uses multimedia to celebrate the Atlantic coastline from New England to Ireland. He performs original compositions on guitar, concertina, mandolin, tin whistle and other instruments and integrates projections of his own photographs of castles, lighthouses, and ships, taken during his travels to New England, Ireland, and Scotland.

In 2013, Mock was recognized by the American Lighthouse Foundation (ALF) as an artist advocate. He launched the Keeper’s House Concert Series to benefit the ALF and to promote the appreciation and preservation of lighthouses.

Collaborations
Since 1996, Mock has been producing and arranging for ACM Female Vocalist of the Year Sylvia, and leads her band on tour as well. He has co-written many of her songs. Their albums together include: 
 The Real Story (1996)
 Where In The World (2002)
 A Cradle In Bethlehem (2002)
 It’s All In The Family (2016)
 Second Bloom – The Hits Re-Imagined (2018)

Mock’s long association with Maura O'Connell has included recording, touring throughout the US and Ireland, and extensive work creating orchestral arrangements of her songs.

In 1998, Mock and the late Butch Baldassari released Cantabile: Duets for Mandolin and Guitar, both as a CD and a book of music transcriptions. In 2007, they recorded Music of O'Carolan, a tribute to Irish composer Turlough O'Carolan. Both albums are on Baldassari's SoundArt label.

Other projects
Mock contributed bodhrán, low whistle, and penny whistle to the soundtrack for Liberty! The American Revolution spearheaded by Mark O'Connor, Yo Yo Ma, and James Taylor.

He also worked with Ma on Heartland: An Appalachian Anthology along with O'Connor, Edgar Meyer, Sam Bush, and others.

Mock has recorded numerous albums of Irish and Colonial American instrumental music for Green Hill Music of Nashville.

Discography
Solo albums
 2005: The Day at Sea (self-released)
 2011: Keeper's Companion (self-released)

As producer
 1996:  Sylvia  - The Real Story (Red Pony)
 2002: Sylvia - Where In The World (Red Pony)
 2002: Sylvia - A Cradle In Bethlehem (Red Pony)
 2008: Thom Schuyler – Prayer of a Desperate Man
 2009: Craig Bickhardt – Brother To The Wind (Stone Barn)
 2014:  Craig Bickhardt  - The More I Wonder (Stone Barn)
 2016: Sylvia - It's All in the Family (Red Pony)
 2018: Sylvia – Second Bloom – The Hits Re-Imagined (Red Pony)
 2018: Thom Shuyler – The Banks of Jordan

As sideman
 1991: Kathy Mattea - Time Passes By (Polygram) – guitar
 Kathy Mattea - Willow In The Wind By (Polygram) – classical guitar on “Where've You Been”
 1995: Nashville Mandolin Ensemble - Plectrasonics ( CMH ) - mandolin
 1995:  Maura O'Connell  - Stories ( Hannibal ) – tin whistle
 1997:  Mark O'Connor  -  Liberty! The American Revolution: Original Television Soundtrack  (Sony Classical) - pennywhistle, bodhrán, low whistle, recorder
 1998: Nanci Griffith:  Other Voices, Too (A Trip Back to Bountiful)  (Elektra) – tin whistle
 1998: Michael W. Smith - Live the Life (Reunion) – tin whistle on track 12,Hello, Goodbye 1998:  Twila Paris  - Perennial (Songs For The Seasons Of Life) ( Sparrow ) – tin whistle
 1999: Tanya Savory - Town to Town ( Philo ) - tin whistle, concertina
 1999:  Martina McBride  -  Emotion  (RCA) - tin whistle, low whistle
 1999:  Tim O'Brien  - The Crossing (Alula) - percussion, low whistle
 1999: Nanci Griffith with the London Symphony Orchestra - The Dust Bowl Symphony (Elektra) – orchestral arranger, acoustic guitar, tin whistle
 2000: David Davidson - Celtic Fantasy (Green Hill) - concertina, bodhrán, guitar, tin whistle
 2001:  Dolly Parton  -  Little Sparrow  ( Sugar Hill ) – tin whistle, harmonium
 2001:  Joshua Bell ,  Sam Bush ,  Béla Fleck ,  Yo-Yo Ma ,  Mike Marshall ,  Edgar Meyer ,  Mark O'Connor ,  James Taylor, and  Alison Krauss  - Heartland: An Appalachian Anthology ( Sony Classical ) - tin whistle, low whistle
 2002: Dixie Chicks -  Home  (Monument) - percussion, bodhrán, uilleann pipes, tin whistle, string arrangements
 2003:  Martina McBride  -  Martina  ( RCA ) - tin whistle on track 1, So Magical 2003:  Sara Evans  -  Restless  (RCA Nashville) - tin whistle, concertina
 2003: Dixie Chicks -  Top of the World Tour: Live  (Monument) - acoustic guitar, tin whistle, concertina, percussion, papoose guitar, string arrangement for “Top Of The World” 
 2004: Peter Cetera – You Just Gotta Love Christmas – tin whistle, low whistles
 2004:  Selah  -  Hiding Place  ( Curb ) – tin whistle
 2005: various artists - Happy Land: Musical Tributes to Laura Ingalls Wilder (Pa's Fiddle) - track 10, Oft in the Stilly Night (accompanying Deborah Packard on guitar)
 2007: Butch Baldassari - The Vespa Love Festival Sessions ( CD Baby )
 2007:  Donna Ulisse  - When I Look Back (Hadley) - tin whistle, concertina, harmonium
 2007:  Gretchen Peters  - Burnt Toast & Offerings (Scarlet Letter) - concertina, tin whistle on track 10, This Town 2008:  Peter Corry  - Sounds of the Soul (self-released) - concertina
 2008: Janet McLaughlin - Shine In The Moon (Muddy Paw) - acoustic guitar, low whistle, tin whistle, concertina
 2008: Dolly Parton -  Backwoods Barbie  (Dolly) - tin whistle, bodhrán, harmonium on track 6, Only Dreamin' 2008:  The Waybacks  - Loaded ( Compass ) – tin whistle
 2008: Sara Evans – Born To Fly/Restless – tin whistle, concertina
 2009:  John Cowan  - Comfort and Joy ( eOne ) - guitar, tin whistle
 2011: Craig Duncan - Irish Country Christmas (Green Hill) - tin whistle, bodhrán, guitar
 2011:  Kathy Troccoli  - Christmas Songs (Green Hill) - bouzouki, guitar, low whistle
 2012:  Anna Ternheim  -  The Night Visitor  ( V2 Records ) - tin whistle on track 8, God Don't Know 2013:  Dawn McCarthy  and  Bonnie and Prince; Billy  -  What the Brothers Sang  ( Drag City ) - mandolin, harmonium
 2013:  Craig Campbell  -  Never Regret  ( Bigger Picture ) - harmonium
 2014:  Jim Hendricks  and Jeff Lisenby - Celtic Heritage: Favorite Irish, Scottish and Old English Melodies (Green Hill) - guitar, mandolin
 2014: Dolly Parton – Blue Smoke - harmonium
 2015:  Tom Paxton  -  Redemption Road  (Pax) – tin whistle
 2016: Alan Jackson – Precious Memories Collection - Harmonium, tin whistle, Uillean Pipes
 2017: The Westies - Six On the Out (Audio & Video Labs) – tin whistle
 2017: Lady Antebellum – Gentle Giant: The Songs of Don Williams – string arrangement and guitar solo on “We've Got A Good Fire Going”

As arranger
 1991: Kathy Mattea - Time Passes By (Polygram) - string arrangements
 1995: George Ducas - George Ducas (Liberty / Capitol) - mandolin arrangements
 1995: October Project - Falling Farther In (Epic) - track 8, "One Dream"
 1996: Lambchop - How I Quit Smoking (Merge) - song arrangements
 1996: Nashville Mandolin Ensemble - Gifts (Sony Music)
 1997: Silvain Vanot - Egérie (Labels) - string arrangements
 1998: Hal Bynum - If I Could Do Anything (Warner Bros.) - guitar
 1998: Michael W. Smith - Live the Life (Reunion) - woodwind arrangements
 1999: Nanci Griffith with the London Symphony Orchestra - The Dust Bowl Symphony (Elektra) - song arrangements
 2002: Dixie Chicks - Home (Monument) - track 12, "Top Of The World"
 2002: Sylvia - A Cradle In Bethlehem (Red Pony) - all string arrangements
 2003: Dixie Chicks - Top of the World Tour: Live (Monument) - cello arrangements, string arrangements
 2016: Sylvia - It's All in the Family (Red Pony) - all string arrangements
 2018: Sylvia – Second Bloom – The Hits Re-Imagined (Red Pony) - all string arrangements

References

External links 
 
 
 

Living people
21st-century American composers
Year of birth missing (living people)
American multi-instrumentalists
Tin whistle players
American folk guitarists
American mandolinists
American session musicians
People from Connecticut
21st-century flautists